Ostrogotha was a leader of the eastern Goths in the Ukraine, who invaded Roman Moesia during the Crisis of the Third Century, mentioned by the 6th-century historian Jordanes. He was a contemporary of King Cniva.

Jordanes' account differs with those of Zosimus and Joannes Zonaras, who do not mention Ostrogotha, and therefore his existence was questioned. Cassiodorus, one of the sources of Jordanes, also mentioned Ostrogotha as one of the ancestors of Amalasuintha, daughter of Theoderic the Great.

However, the discovery of lost fragments of the Sythica of Dexippus give confirmation to his existence.

Jordanes
Jordanes reported that during the reign of the Emperor Domitian the Goths broke a truce they had with the Roman emperors (XIII 76). After several victories, including a successful defence against a Roman counterattack, Jordanes claimed that the Goths likened their leaders to demigods or "Ansis" (XIII 78). According to Jordanes, Ostrogotha was part of the Amal family, whose genealogy he recited, making him an ancestor of Ermanaric and Theodoric the Great (XIV 79).

Ablabius the historian relates that in Scythia, where we have said that they were dwelling above an arm of the Pontic Sea, part of them who held the eastern region and whose king was Ostrogotha, were called Ostrogoths, that is, eastern Goths, either from his name or from the place. But the rest were called Visigoths, that is, the Goths of the western country. (XIV 82)

Jordanes reported that Ostrogotha crossed the Danube during the reign of Philip the Arab and invaded the provinces of Moesia and Thrace. The later emperor Decius could not defeat him either, whereupon Ostrogotha again raided Roman territory.

Now when the aforesaid Philip--who, with his son Philip, was the only Christian emperor before Constantine--ruled over the Romans, in the second year of his reign Rome completed its one thousandth year. He withheld from the Goths the tribute due them; whereupon they were naturally enraged and instead of friends became his foes. For though they dwelt apart under their own kings, yet they had been allied to the Roman state and received annual gifts. And what more? Ostrogotha and his men soon crossed the Danube and ravaged Moesia and Thrace. Philip sent the senator Decius against him. And since he could do nothing against the Getae, he released his own soldiers from military service and sent them back to private life, as though it had been by their neglect that the Goths had crossed the Danube. When, as he supposed, he had thus taken vengeance on his soldiers, he returned to Philip. But when the soldiers found themselves expelled from the army after so many hardships, in their anger they had recourse to the protection of Ostrogotha, king of the Goths. He received them, was aroused by their words and presently led out three hundred thousand armed men, having as allies for this war some of the Taifali and Astringi and also three thousand of the Carpi, a race of men very ready to make war and frequently hostile to the Romans. But in later times when Diocletian and Maximian were Emperors, the Caesar Galerius Maximianus conquered them and made them tributary to the Roman Empire. Besides these tribes, Ostrogotha had Goths and Peucini from the island of Peuce, which lies in the mouths of the Danube where they empty into the Sea of Pontus. He placed in command Argaithus and Guntheric, the noblest leaders of his race. They speedily crossed the Danube, devastated Moesia a second time and approached Marcianople, the famed metropolis of that land. Yet after a long siege they departed, upon receiving money from the inhabitants. (XVI 89-92)

Ostrogotha also fended off a challenge from the kinsfolk of the Goths, the Gepids, under the leadership of their king Fastida.

For he sent ambassadors to Ostrogotha, to whose rule Ostrogoths and Visigoths alike, that is, the two peoples of the same tribe, were still subject. Complaining that he was hemmed in by rugged mountains and dense forests, he demanded one of two things,--that Ostrogotha should either prepare for war or give up part of his lands to them. Then Ostrogotha, king of the Goths, who was a man of firm mind, answered the ambassadors that he did indeed dread such a war and that it would be a grievous and infamous thing to join battle with their kin,--but he would not give up his lands. And why say more? The Gepidae hastened to take arms and Ostrogotha likewise moved his forces against them, lest he should seem a coward. They met at the town of Galtis, near which the river Auha flows, and there both sides fought with great valor; indeed the similarity of their arms and of their manner of fighting turned them against their own men. But the better cause and their natural alertness aided the Goths. Finally night put an end to the battle as a part of the Gepidae were giving way. Then Fastida, king of the Gepidae, left the field of slaughter and hastened to his own land, as much humiliated with shame and disgrace as formerly he had been elated with pride. The Goths returned victorious, content with the retreat of the Gepidae, and dwelt in peace and happiness in their own land so long as Ostrogotha was their leader. (XVII 98-100)

After his death, Jordanes mentions a new ruler of Goths, Cniva.

Dexippus
In the Vienna fragment of Dexippus, Cniva and Ostrogotha are contemporaries and competitors. Ostrogotha was still alive when Cniva conquered Philippopolis and Ostrogotha was jealous of the high regard Cniva was given because of this victory. He set out to battle the Roman leader Decius and was apparently the Gothic leader responsible for the defeat of Decius (which is also reported by Jordanes as happening after Phillipopolis). 
 But when Ostrogouthos, the leader of the Scythians, heard that Philippopolis was taken, and that (?) indeed the Scythians were holding Cniva in the highest regard, and were celebrating him in song, as is their ancestral custom when they have especially good fortune and success in war, whereas they were holding himself [in less esteem], charging him with cowardice and failure in his tactics, he thought it unbearable not to make amends to the Scythian cause by some notable achievement, setting out, he marched quickly with an army of about fifty thousand. But Decius was grieved by <his> failure to bring help and by the capture of Philip (194v) popolis, and when the army was collected to the number of about eighty thousand, his intention was to renew the war if he could, thinking that even if he had failed to bring help, the honorable (course) was at least to set free the Thracian captives and to prevent them from crossing to the other side [of the Danube]. And having in the meanwhile made a ditch near Amisos (?), a village of the territory of Beroea, he remained within the stockade with his army, keeping awatch for when the enemy might (try to) cross. But when the advance of the force under Ostrogouthos was reported to him, he decided it was necessary to encourage the soldiers as the opportunity offered, and after calling them together in assembly he said something like this: If only, (my) men, the body of the army and our subject to us had been successful. But since the vicissitudes of humanity bring many calamities, as is the rule for mortals, it is perhaps the duty of wise men to accept events and not to be less brave in disposition, and not, because (you are) shaken by the failure in the plain and the capture of the Thracians (in case any of you has lost heart because of these events), to become cowards. For both setbacks can be disputed [i.e. can be explained away]. For the first was due to the treachery of the sentinels rather than to cowardice on our part, and they took the Thracians city, after despairing of doing so by direct attack, by treachery rather than by valor. But weakness is not courage (?)

Cniva was described as a king (βασιλεύς) while Ostrogotha was described as an archon or leader of Scythians (τῶν Σκυθῶν ἄρχων).

References

Sources

Also see
 Thomas Gerhardt, Udo Hartmann: Fasti. In: Klaus-Peter Johne (Hrsg.): Die Zeit der Soldatenkaiser. Band 2. Akademie Verlag, Berlin 2008, S. 1194f. 
 Jana Grusková, Gunter Martin: Ein neues Textstück aus den „Scythica Vindobonensia“ zu den Ereignissen nach der Eroberung von Philippopolis. In: Tyche 29, 2014, S. 29–43.
 Jana Grusková, Gunter Martin: Zum Angriff der Goten unter Kniva auf eine thrakische Stadt (Scythica Vindobonensia, f. 195v). In: Tyche 30, 2015, S. 35–53

External links
English translation of Getica by Jordanes: https://people.ucalgary.ca/~vandersp/Courses/texts/jordgeti.html

Year of birth unknown
Year of death unknown
3rd-century Gothic people
Gothic kings
Gothic warriors